The Mole Show Live at the Roxy is a live recording by American art rock group the Residents.  The show was originally bootlegged, and The Cryptic Corporation bought the master tapes, releasing it officially on Ralph Records in 1983.  1800 copies were pressed on black vinyl, and a picture disc edition of 1500 copies was also released.  The album was released in 1998 by Bomba Records in Japan.

Track listing
Tracks 3, 5, 7, 10, 12 and 15 are narration interludes by Penn Jillette.

Personnel 
The Residents – performance
Nessie Lessons – vocals on "Happy Home"
Penn Jillette – narration
Scott Fraser – sound

References

1983 live albums
The Residents albums
Ralph Records albums